Rosane Ferreira (Cleusa Rosane Ribas Ferreira, born Clevelândia, Paraná, July 31, 1963), is a nurse and a Brazilian politician.

At six months old she moved with her mother Virginia Martins Ribas to the city of União da Vitória. At age 19 she moved to the town of Araucária, Curitiba, to attend college.  She graduated in Nursing and Midwifery from the Pontifical Catholic University of Paraná in 1988.

She studied for a specialization in Public Health at the Oswaldo Cruz Foundation (Rio de Janeiro) in 1997, followed by an improvement in Collective Health at Federal University of Paraná in 2004. She conducted training courses in Health Planning at the Federal University of Santa Catarina and nursing locomotor Hospital Sarah Kubitschek in Brasilia.

In 1983 she started her activities in Araucária, acting as Nurse Family Health program. She also coordinated health centers with the supervision of Units Network Health as director of the Departments of Health and Sanitation and Health Surveillance.  In this position she developed teaching activities as an instructor of courses and attendant nurse and training of community health workers.  She assisted in the implementation of the Pastoral, was a member of the Pastoral Worker and Family and the President of the Municipal Health Council in 2004 and 2005.

Awards
In 2011 she received the Anna Nery Award, from the Federal Board of Nursing, for her involvement in the causes of nursing as Congresswoman.

References

External links
 Official page 
 Rosane Ferreira Twitter 
 Rosane Ferreira - Flickr 

1963 births
Living people
People from Paraná (state)
Members of the Chamber of Deputies (Brazil) from Paraná
Green Party (Brazil) politicians
Brazilian women in politics
Pontifical Catholic University of Paraná alumni